The Gutenberg-Jahrbuch is an annual periodical publication covering the history of printing and the book. Its focus is on incunables, early printing, and the life and work of Johannes Gutenberg, inventor of the modern printed book. It has been published since 1926 by the Internationale Gutenberg-Gesellschaft, the international association for the study of the history and development of printing technology and written media. 
Dr Stephan Füssel was editor from 1994-2022.

See also 
Gutenberg Museum
Gutenberg Prize of the International Gutenberg Society and the City of Mainz

References  

Anton Keim: Mehr als zwei Denkmäler: Neunzig Jahre Weltmuseum der Druckkunst und internationale Gutenberg-Gesellschaft Mainz. Gutenberg-Gesellschaft, Mainz 1991,

External links 
 
Internationale Gutenberg-Gesellschaft 
Gutenberg-Museum 

Printing
Multilingual journals
Publications established in 1926
Johannes Gutenberg
History journals
Annual journals